Mahmud ibn Ali al-Qashani (Arabic: محمود بن على بن محمد القاشانى ) a Sufi scholar and Islamic author from Kashan, Persia. He died in 735 H.E. / 1335 A.D.

Works 
 Lubab al-Qut Min Khaza'in al-Malakut, completed in 1320s.
 Sharh Ta'iyah ibn al-Farid (The commentary on Ibn Farid's poem "Ta'iyah")
 Sharh al-Khamariyah (The commentary on Ibn Farid's poem "al-Khamariyah")
 Misbah al-Hidayah wa Miftah al-Kifayah

References

Year of birth missing
1335 deaths
People from Kashan
Iranian scholars